Vehari Tehsil , is an administrative subdivision (tehsil), of Vehari District in the Punjab province of Pakistan. The city of Vehari is the headquarters of the tehsil which is administratively subdivided into 26 Union Councils.

Administration
The tehsil of Vehari is administratively subdivided into 26 Union Councils, these are:

References

 

Vehari District
Tehsils of Punjab, Pakistan